John Hurst may refer to:
John Hurst (American football) (born 1996), American football player
John Hurst (footballer), English footballer
John Fletcher Hurst, bishop
John Hurst (archaeologist) (1927–2003), British archaeologist
John Hurst (sport shooter) (born 1933), American Olympic shooter
J. Willis Hurst, American cardiologist

See also

John Hirst (disambiguation)
Jonathan Hurst